Miklós Péter Lukáts (27 March 1946 – 30 October 2022) was a Hungarian Lutheran minister and politician who served in the National Assembly of Hungary from 1990 until 1994. A founding member of the Christian Democratic People's Party, Lukáts was a key figure in the end of communism in Hungary and oversaw the transition in Hungarian religious policy in his position as State Secretary for Church Affairs.

Biography
Miklós Lukáts was born on 27 March 1946 in the city of Szombathely, Hungary. Lukáts's father died when he was young, and he was primarily raised by his grandfather, a former judge who remained politically active. Lukáts and his grandfather would frequently talk about politics, and Lukáts credited this for his interest in politics.

In the late 1980s, Lukáts was a key figure in the end of communism in Hungary. The following year, Lukáts and other members of the Áron Márton Society refounded the Christian Democratic People's Party (KDNP), with Lukáts becoming its national organizing secretary. In the 1990 Hungarian parliamentary election, Lukáts was elected to the National Assembly of Hungary via the KDNP party list, becoming one of 21 KDNP candidates elected. He did not seek re-election in the 1994 Hungarian parliamentary election.

During his tenure in parliament, Lukáts was heavily involved with shift in religious policy following the end of communism, which saw the  abolished and no office established to replace it. Lukáts was appointed a state secretary in the Ministry of Culture and Public Education on 1 June 1990; in this role, Lukáts oversaw the introduction of religious education in Hungary. As state secretary, Lukáts's primary task was to oversee the transfer of church properties that had been seized during communist rule back to their original owners, and he was to serve as a "connecting link between the government and the churches". During his tenure, Lukáts was one of the organisers for visits by Pope John Paul II and the 14th Dalai Lama to Hungary. He also held negotiations with the World Council of Churches and the government of Switzerland regarding the Hungarian Reformed Church. Lukáts served in this role until he left parliament in 1994. While in parliament, Lukáts also served on the Environmental Protection Committee.

On 25 March 1992, the day after the opening ceremony of the European Protestant Convention in Budapest, Lukáts formed the KDNP Protestant Workshop, a parliamentary organization which sought to "promote the participation of Protestants in public life" and to "provide a political alternative to non-Catholic Christians". Lukáts served as the workshop's chairman from its founding until 1996. After leaving parliament, Lukáts became a Lutheran minister, and he served as a member of the national presbytery from 1992 to 2000.

Lukáts died from an illness on 30 October 2022 at the age of 76.

Personal life
He was the son of Rezső  and Borbála Medveczky. In 1970, he married Ágnes Juhász. They had two sons together, Péter Lukáts in 1971 and Tamás Lukáts in 1977, who are musicians in the Hungarian psychobilly band .

Lukáts was the great-grandson of Béla Medveczky, who took part in the Hungarian Revolution of 1848.

References

Citations

Works cited

1946 births
2022 deaths
20th-century Hungarian architects
Hungarian Lutheran clergy
Hungarian Lutherans
Members of the National Assembly of Hungary (1990–1994)
Christian Democratic People's Party (Hungary) politicians
Recipients of the Order of Merit of the Republic of Hungary
Place of death missing
People from Szombathely